Dominus is a real-time strategy video game developed by Visual Concepts and released for MS-DOS in 1994. A Sega Genesis version was planned but never released.

Gameplay
The game takes place in a medieval fantasy world. The player controls a king who must defend his kingdom from several invading kingdoms, all of whom are attacking simultaneously from different directions. The invaders start moving in from the outlying villages, into the castle walls, and finally entering the keep itself. The player defends the kingdom by laying traps, casting spells, deploying monsters to fight, and flying into the battlefield to allow the player to fight directly (as the king).

The game features strategic elements which are not often found in real time strategy games, such as setting monsters to the task of collecting spell and trap ingredients, and interrogating prisoners.

References

Dominus won Electronic Entertainments 1994 "Best Strategy Game" award. The editors wrote that the game "delivers great game play, no matter which way you choose to play."

References

External links

1994 video games
Cancelled Sega Genesis games
DOS games
DOS-only games
Real-time strategy video games
U.S. Gold games
Video games scored by Russell Lieblich
Video games developed in the United States